Naked Came the Phoenix: A Serial Novel is a 2001 mystery novel written in serial installments by thirteen popular female authors, including collaboration editor Marcia Talley. The title was intended to evoke 1969's famously-collaborative Naked Came the Stranger rather than the 1996 parody Naked Came the Manatee.

Authors
All thirteen authors have been featured in The New York Times Book Review. The authors included:
 Chapter 1 by Nevada Barr
 Chapter 2 by Nora Roberts, credited as J. D. Robb
 Chapter 3 by Nancy Pickard
 Chapter 4 by Lisa Scottoline
 Chapter 5 by Perri O'Shaughnessy, pen name of Mary O'Shaughnessy and Pam O'Shaughnessy
 Chapter 6 by J. A. Jance
 Chapter 7 by Faye Kellerman
 Chapter 8 by Mary Jane Clark
 Chapter 9 by Marcia Talley
 Chapter 10 by Anne Perry
 Chapter 11 by Diana Gabaldon
 Chapter 12 by Val McDermid
 Chapter 13 by Laurie R. King

See also
 The Floating Admiral

References

External links

 Naked Came the Phoenix on Google Books

2001 British novels
American mystery novels
Collaborative novels
British mystery novels
Minotaur Books books